HSFS may refer to:
 El Fasher Airport, in Sudan
 High Sierra Format, a filesystem